Gsteig may refer to:

Gsteig, Germany in Ostallgäu, Bavaria
Gsteig bei Gstaad, a municipality in the district Saanen, Canton of Berne, Switzerland
The church Gsteig bei Interlaken (municipality of Gsteigwiler, Switzerland)

.